is a railway station in the city of Agano, Niigata, Japan, operated by East Japan Railway Company (JR East).

Lines
Kyōgase Station is served by the Uetsu Main Line, and is 6.1 kilometers from the terminus of the line at Niitsu Station.

Station layout
The station consists of two ground-level opposed side platforms serving two tracks with the platforms connected by a footbridge. However, only one of the platforms is normally in use, and serves bi-directional traffic. The station is unattended.

Platforms

History
Kyōgase Station opened on 30 September 1943 as a signal stop. It became a full station on 1 April 1962. With the privatization of Japanese National Railways (JNR) on 1 April 1987, the station came under the control of JR East.

Surrounding area
The station is located in a rural area, surrounded by rice fields. There are few buildings nearby.

See also
 List of railway stations in Japan

External links

 JR East station information 

Railway stations in Niigata Prefecture
Uetsu Main Line
Railway stations in Japan opened in 1962
Agano, Niigata